12:5 is the first live album by Swedish band Pain of Salvation. It was released in 2004 and was recorded from a concert in the band's home town of Eskilstuna, Sweden, on 12 May (12.5) 2003. It was an "unplugged" show, meaning that there were only acoustic instruments, i.e. no electric guitars; grand piano and harpsichord instead of synthesizers. It features songs from all the band's albums to that date except One Hour by the Concrete Lake.

Outline
The songs of 12:5 are not simply the original studio versions played with acoustic instruments. Most have been rearranged and have new parts layered over the top of old ones. The reasoning behind this is that the band did not want to simply release "Pain of Salvation Live", but rather a performance of the band taking a more personal and different approach to the material. Reactions to the album were mainly positive, and the band was applauded for its ability to re-interpret their own material. Of particular note is the 12:5 version of "Ashes" which begins with its original intro (in A minor), but then continues in an uplifting major key.

"Reconciliation" contains a short excerpt from the Imperial March theme from the Star Wars trilogy.

Track listing

At the actual concert the band played an encore song, "Ashes" (in the original key).

Personnel 
Band:
Daniel Gildenlöw – lead vocals, acoustic guitar
Fredrik Hermansson – grand piano, harpsichord
Johan Hallgren – acoustic guitar, backing vocals (lead vocals on Chain Sling chorus)
Johan Langell – drums, backing vocals
Kristoffer Gildenlöw – acoustic bass, cello, backing vocals

References

Pain of Salvation live albums
2004 live albums
Inside Out Music live albums